Tom Ferguson (21 November 1920 – 29 May 2008) was a former Australian rules footballer who played with Melbourne and Hawthorn in the Victorian Football League (VFL).

Notes

External links 

1920 births
2008 deaths
Australian rules footballers from Victoria (Australia)
Melbourne Football Club players
Hawthorn Football Club players